Thomas Patrick Collins, M.M. (January 13, 1915 – December 7, 1973) was an American-born Catholic missionary and bishop. As a member of the Catholic Foreign Mission Society of America (Maryknoll) he was assigned to missions in Bolivia. He served as the Vicar Apostolic of the Pando from 1961 to 1968.

Early life and education
Thomas Collins was born in the San Francisco, California and was one of seven children.  He was educated at Sacred Heart School and studied for the priesthood at seminaries in Mountain View, California and Venard before being ordained a priest on June 21, 1942.

Priesthood
Brown spent his entire career in the Maryknoll Misson in Bolivia.  He did pastoral work in a mission station  from the Mission Center at Riberalta.

Episcopacy
Pope John XXIII appointed Collins as the Titular Bishop of Sufetula and Vicar Apostolic of Pando on November 15, 1960.  He was consecrated  by Auxiliary Bishop Hugh Donohoe of San Francisco at the Cathedral of Saint Mary of the Assumption in San Francisco on March 7, 1961.  The principal co-consecrators were San Francisco Auxiliary Bishop Merlin Guilfoyle and Bishop John Comber, M.M., the Maryknoll Superior General.  Collins attended all four sessions of the Second Vatican Council (1962-1965).  In 1967 he returned to Mountain View for medical treatment.  His resignation for health reasons was accepted by Pope Paul VI in November 1968.

Later life and death
Bishop Collins became a resident at the Ferncliff Nursing Home in Rhinebeck, New York.  He died there on December 7, 1973 at the age of 58.  His funeral was celebrated at Our Lady Queen of Apostles Chapel in the Maryknoll Center and was buried in the Maryknoll Cemetery.

References

1915 births
1973 deaths
Clergy from San Francisco
American Roman Catholic clergy of Irish descent
American Roman Catholic missionaries
Roman Catholic missionaries in Bolivia
20th-century Roman Catholic bishops in Bolivia
20th-century American Roman Catholic titular bishops
Maryknoll Seminary alumni
Maryknoll bishops
Participants in the Second Vatican Council
American expatriates in Bolivia
Catholics from California
Roman Catholic bishops of Pando